Petra Jurčová (born 22 June 1987) is a Slovak ice hockey forward and former member of the Slovak national ice hockey team. She represented Slovakia in the women's ice hockey tournament at the 2006 Winter Olympics, at seven IIHF Women's World Championship tournaments at the Top Division through Division II levels, and in the women's ice hockey tournaments at the Winter Universiades in 2009 and 2011.

Jurčová most recently played with ŽHK 2000 Šarišanka Prešov in the 2020–21 season of the Slovak Women's Extraliga.

International career
Jurčová was selected for the women's ice hockey team of the Slovak Olympic delegation at the 2010 Winter Olympics. She played in all five games, recording one assist. She played in the qualifying campaigns for the 2010 and 2014 Olympics.

Jurčová has also appeared for Slovakia at seven IIHF Women's World Championships, across three levels. Her first appearance came in 2005. She appeared at the Top Level championships in 2011 and 2012.

Personal life 
Jurčová's younger brother, Tomáš Jurčo, is also an ice hockey player; he has played with several teams in the National Hockey League (NHL) and represented  in the men's ice hockey tournament at the 2014 Winter Olympics.

Career statistics

International

Sources:

References

External links
 
 
 

1987 births
Living people
Sportspeople from Košice
Slovak women's ice hockey forwards
Ice hockey players at the 2010 Winter Olympics
Olympic ice hockey players of Slovakia
Universiade medalists in ice hockey
Universiade bronze medalists for Slovakia
Competitors at the 2011 Winter Universiade
Competitors at the 2009 Winter Universiade
Slovak expatriate ice hockey players in the Czech Republic